Owen Okundaye (born 19 April 1936) is a Nigerian athlete. He competed in the men's pole vault at the 1960 Summer Olympics.

References

1936 births
Living people
Athletes (track and field) at the 1960 Summer Olympics
Nigerian male pole vaulters
Olympic athletes of Nigeria
Place of birth missing (living people)